Greenville Presbyterian Church is a historic Presbyterian church located near Donalds, Greenwood County, South Carolina. It was built in 1852 and is a meeting house form, Greek Revival style brick church.  Also on the property are a small brick Session House, a large historic cemetery containing about 1,200 identifiable graves, and a natural spring. The earliest graves in the church cemetery date from 1777 and numerous markers indicate service in the American Revolution and American Civil War.

It was listed on the National Register of Historic Places in 1998.

References

Presbyterian churches in South Carolina
Churches on the National Register of Historic Places in South Carolina
Churches completed in 1852
Greek Revival church buildings in South Carolina
19th-century Presbyterian church buildings in the United States
National Register of Historic Places in Greenwood County, South Carolina
Buildings and structures in Greenwood County, South Carolina
1852 establishments in South Carolina